The Second League consisted of 12 participants.

Final standings
 FC Karpaty Pechenizhyn
 FC Prydnistrovya Tlumach
 FC Karpaty Bolekhiv
 FC Koloc Pyadyky
 FC Pidhirya
 FC Prut Deliatyn
 FC Khutrovyk Tysmenytsia
 FC Karpaty Kuty
 FC Krona-Karpaty Broshniv-Osada
 FC Dnister Poberezhia
 FC Chornohora-Nika Ivano-Frankivsk
 FC Cheremosh Verkhovyna

See also
2008 Ivano-Frankivsk Oblast Championship
Ivano-Frankivsk Oblast FF

Ivano-Frankivsk Oblast Second League
5
5